A fugitive is a person fleeing from arrest.

The Fugitive, The Fugitives, Fugitive, or Fugitives may also refer to:

Arts and entertainment

Films 
 The Fugitive (1910 film), a film directed by D.W. Griffith set during the American Civil War
 The Fugitive (1914 film), a Russian-French short
 The Fugitive (1920 film), a French silent film directed by André Hugon
 The Fugitive (1925 film), an American silent film directed by Ben F. Wilson
 Fugitives (1929 film), an American film directed by William Beaudine
 The Fugitive (1933 film), an American western film starring Rex Bell 
 The Fugitive (1939 film), the American title of the British film On the Night of the Fire
 The Fugitive (1947 film), an American film starring Henry Fonda and Dolores del Río
 The Fugitive (1947 French film), a French film directed by Robert Bibal
 The Fugitive (1965 film), a South Korean film starring Kim Ji-mee
 The Fugitive (1972 film), a Hong Kong film
 The Fugitive (1993 film), starring Harrison Ford and Tommy Lee Jones, based on the 1960s TV series 
 The Fugitive (2003 film), an Italian crime-drama film Il fuggiasco and its soundtrack
 The Fugitive (2019 film), an Indonesian film starring Adipati Dolken
 Fugitive (2019 film), a Nigerian film

Literature
 Fugitives (poets), a 1920s American literary circle at Vanderbilt University
 La Fugitive or Albertine disparue, the sixth volume of Marcel Proust's In Search of Lost Time
 "The Fugitive" (poem), an 1838 poem by Mikhail Lermontov
 The Fugitive (Ugo Betti play), a 1953 play by Ugo Betti
 The Fugitive, a 1913 play by John Galsworthy
 The Fugitive, a novel by Pramoedya Ananta Toer
 The Fugitives (novel), a 1908 novel by Johannes Linnankoski
"Fugitives", a 2019 poem by Simon Armitage to commemorate 70 years of AONBs

Music
 The Fugitives (band), a 1960s California garage-rock band
 The Fugitives (spoken word), a Canadian music and spoken-word ensemble
 The Fugitive (album), a 1983 album by Tony Banks
 "Fugitive" (song), a 2008 song by David Gray
 "Fugitive", a song by Danger Danger from the album Revolve
 "Fugitive", a song by the Pet Shop Boys from Fundamental
 "The Fugitive" (song), a 1966 song by Merle Haggard
 "The Fugitive", a song by Debbie Harry from the album Debravation
 "The Fugitive", a song by Iron Maiden from Fear of the Dark

Television 
 The Fugitive (1963 TV series), a 1963–1967 American series starring David Janssen
 The Fugitive (2000 TV series), a 2000–2001 American remake of the 1960s series
 The Fugitive (2020 TV series), a 2020 American remake of the 1960s series
 The Fugitives (TV series), a 2005 UK children's series
 Fugitive, the fourth volume of episodes in Heroes (season 3), 
 "Fugitive" (Grimm), a 2017 episode of the supernatural drama
 "Fugitive" (The Professionals), a 1980 episode of the crime-action drama
 "The Fugitive" (Brooklyn Nine-Nine), a 2017 two-part episode of the police sitcom
 "The Fugitive" (The Twilight Zone), a 1962 episode of the anthology

Other uses
 Fugitive (game), an outdoor tag game
 fugitive.vim, a plugin for the Vim text editor

See also 
 
 Fugitive pigment, pigments that change over time